Tuvshinbayar Naidan ( born 1 June 1984) is a  former professional Mongolian judoka. He is the 2008 Olympic Champion, 2012 Olympic silver medalist, 2014 Asian games champion, 2017 Budapest Bronze medalist, 2016 Asian championship Gold medalist, 2007 silver medalist and two-time (2008, 2011) bronze medalist in –100 kg division.  Naidan is serving a sixteen-year jail term for a 2021 fatal assault on a fellow judoka and childhood friend.

Olympic career
At the 2006 Asian Games he finished in joint fifth place in both the heavyweight (-100 kg) division and the open weight class division.

In the same division, he won a gold medal at the Olympic Games 2008 in Beijing. He was the first Mongolian ever to win a gold medal at the Olympics, by defeating Kazakhstani judoka Askhat Zhitkeyev. On 14 August 2008, he was inducted as the state honoured athlete of Mongolia as well as a hero of labour.

At the 2012 Summer Olympics in London, he won a silver medal, becoming the first Olympic multimedalist from Mongolia. He won his silver medal despite suffering a serious injury in the semifinal bout.
Also at the 2017 Budapest,he won a bronze medal became the Olympics,World Championships multimedalist.

Assault and jailing
In April 2021, Tüvshinbayar was jailed for 20 days following a drunken assault on Erdenebileg Enkhbat, who was a childhood friend. Enkhbat died on 24 December 2021 from a brain injury related to the assault.  Following Enkhbat's death, new charges were filed against Tüvshinbayar. On 9 June 2022, the Khan-Uul District Court sentenced Tuvshinbayar to 16 years in prison for the deadly assault.

References

External links
 
 
 
 

1984 births
Living people
People from Bulgan Province
Mongolian male judoka
Olympic judoka of Mongolia
Judoka at the 2008 Summer Olympics
Judoka at the 2012 Summer Olympics
Judoka at the 2016 Summer Olympics
Olympic gold medalists for Mongolia
Olympic silver medalists for Mongolia
Olympic medalists in judo
Medalists at the 2012 Summer Olympics
Medalists at the 2008 Summer Olympics
Asian Games medalists in judo
Judoka at the 2006 Asian Games
Judoka at the 2010 Asian Games
Judoka at the 2014 Asian Games
Asian Games gold medalists for Mongolia
Medalists at the 2014 Asian Games
Judoka at the 2018 Asian Games
Mongolian criminals